Kenneth Miller (born 21 May 1958) is a Trinidadian cricketer. He played in one List A and five first-class matches for Trinidad and Tobago from 1978 to 1982.

See also
 List of Trinidadian representative cricketers

References

External links
 

1958 births
Living people
Trinidad and Tobago cricketers